A sexless marriage is a marital union in which little or no sexual activity occurs between the two spouses. The US National Health and Social Life Survey in 1992 found that 2% of married respondents aged 18 to 59 reported no sexual intimacy in the past year. Comparatively 92% of married respondents aged 65 to 80 reported no sexual intimacy in the past year. The definition of a non-sexual marriage is often broadened to include those where sexual intimacy occurs fewer than ten times per year, in which case 20 percent of the couples in the National Health and Social Life Survey would be in the category. Other studies show that 10% or less of the married population below age 50 have not had sex in the past year. In addition less than 20% report having sex a few times per year, or even monthly, under the age 40.

Causes
Sexless marriages can develop over time from a range of possible causes.

Some couples may have sexless marriages because they have different work schedules or busy lives. For couples with children, especially young children, the demands of childbearing and child rearing can lead to stress and exhaustion. Fatigue or exhaustion can also arise from other causes, such as disease.

Adultery can lead to a sexless marriage in two ways: it can cause the partner having the affair to have reduced sexual interest in their spouse, and if the affair is discovered, the monogamous spouse may cease to want to be intimate with the adulterous spouse.

Sexual aversion or "a low level of sexual desire" includes a lack of sexual vitality due to age, past trauma, partners' incompatible sexual orientation or, simply, one of the spouses losing sexual interest in the regular companion.

Sexual dysfunction or difficulty during any stage of the sexual act includes but is not limited to severe vaginismus or erectile dysfunction, and lack of sensations, desire or ability to achieve orgasm resulting as side effects from medication or illegal drugs. Some antidepressant drugs such as SSRIs can cause difficulty with achieving an erection or an orgasm. Sexless marriages can be caused by post-pregnancy issues and hormonal imbalances, or by illness of one or both partners that affects physical or psychological sexuality (e.g., clinical depression of one or both partners). Certain endocrine medications used to treat prostate cancer in men, and to prevent natal puberty in transgender male-to-female adolescent patients such as androgen blockers can cause or exacerbate sexual dysfunction.

A marriage may also be sexless if one or both partners is asexual or if the couple mutually agrees to abstain from sex due to religious principles, avoidance of sexually transmitted diseases, a platonic basis for the relationship or the goal of avoiding conception.

Other reasons for sexless marriages are resentment in the relationship due to an imbalance of duties, responsibilities (moral, spiritual and religious); incompatible ideal, spiritual, moral and behavioral aspects.

Some chronic marital conflict can generate a state of permanent hostility that prevents or blocks sexual expression. The partner who behaves in a passive aggressive way is usually the one who blocks sexual intercourse as punishment for some imaginary or real slight received from the other. Partners then feel resentment because of the perceived rejection by the partner who lost interest in sexual communication. Loneliness, anger and self-esteem lowering are normal reactions by a person feeling their sexual human needs frustrated by voluntary rejection from a partner.

Some couples may be married solely for legal purposes or tax benefits, i.e. what is colloquially called a marriage of convenience. For example, in the US a spouse is entitled to a Green Card if married to an American citizen or permanent resident. Another reason for a "marriage of convenience" is the lavender marriage, which conceals the homosexual or bisexual orientation of one or both spouses.

Habituation can be an important factor as well. Frequency of intercourse tends to diminish over time, especially after 1–2 years of marriage. Sex takes place with the same person all the time, usually in the same way. Novelty and interest can be lost, and routine may dominate.

See also
Mariage blanc, a marriage without consummation.
Josephite marriage, a marriage sexless out of religious motivation.
Marriage of convenience, a marriage for reasons other than love and commitment.
Lavender marriage, a marriage concealing discriminated sexual orientation.
Lesbian bed death, the concept that committed relationships between women have less sex the longer the relationship lasts.

References

Further reading
 Cochran, Cate. "Strangers in the night". Globe and Mail. Friday, Feb. 15, 2008
 Davis, Michele Weiner The Sex Starved Marriage: Boosting Your Marriage Libido: A Couple's Guide
 Nickson, Elizabeth. When Sexless Marriage Becomes the Norm
 Kinsey Institute. Sex Survey & Frequency
 Parker-Pope, Tara. "When Sex Leaves the Marriage". New York Times.

Types of marriage
Non-sexuality